Muriel Newman (born 6 April 1950) is a former New Zealand politician for the ACT New Zealand party. She was a member of the New Zealand Parliament from 1996 until 2005, when she was not re-elected.

Early years
Newman was born in northern England. She arrived in New Zealand at the age of eight and was raised in Whangarei. She gained a BSc in mathematics from the University of Auckland, and then a Ph.D. in mathematics education from Rutgers University in the United States. After working in the education sector for twenty years, she entered the business world with Michael Hill International, eventually becoming the deputy general manager of the New Zealand operation before being elected to Parliament. She has been a president of the Northland Chamber of Commerce, a member of the Northland Health Board, and member of the Northland Conservation Board.

She is married to Frank Newman, an accountant and former member of the Whangārei District Council.

Member of Parliament

Newman was a founding member of the ACT New Zealand party. She was one of its candidates in the 1996 general election, the first election the party contested, and was elected to Parliament as one of ACT's eight list MPs. She was re-elected in 1999 and 2002 and was party whip.

In 2004, when Richard Prebble stepped down as ACT's leader, Newman stood as a candidate to succeed him; she lost to Rodney Hide, but emerged with the role of deputy leader. She was placed third on ACT's party list in the 2005 election, but lost her seat in Parliament, as ACT's representation was reduced from nine MPs to only two.

After Parliament
After leaving Parliament in 2005, Newman established the New Zealand Centre for Political Debate (since renamed the New Zealand Centre for Political Research), an independent public policy think tank.

References

Further reading

Newman's contribution is a paper entitled: "Welfare reform: for the sake of our children."

Newman's contribution is a paper entitled: "For the general welfare."

Newman's contribution is a paper entitled: "ACT's welfare vision."

"Lessons from the past." in

External links
 New Zealand Centre for Political Research

1950 births
ACT New Zealand MPs
Living people
New Zealand educators
Rutgers University alumni
University of Auckland alumni
People from Whangārei
Women members of the New Zealand House of Representatives
English emigrants to New Zealand
New Zealand list MPs
Members of the New Zealand House of Representatives
Unsuccessful candidates in the 2005 New Zealand general election
21st-century New Zealand politicians
21st-century New Zealand women politicians